Oumar Mickaël Solet Bomawoko (born 7 February 2000) is a French professional footballer who plays as a defender for Austrian Bundesliga club Red Bull Salzburg.

Club career

Laval
Solet developed through the Stade Laval academy. He made his debut on 4 August 2017 in the Championnat National against US Concarneau. He played the full 90 minutes in a 1–0 away victory.

Lyon
On 22 January 2018, Solet joined Olympique Lyonnais on loan from Stade Laval for €550,000, with an option to make the move permanent for an additional €550,000, up to €2 million in bonuses and 20% of the profits from his next sale.

RB Salzburg 
On 17 July 2020, Solet joined Red Bull Salzburg for €4.5 million, up to €4 million in bonuses, and 15% of any future sale.

International career 
Solet was born in France and is of Central African descent. Solet was part of the France U-17 FIFA World Cup squad in 2017.

Career statistics

Honours
Austrian Bundesliga: 2020-21, 2021-22
Austrian Cup: 2020-21, 2021-22

References

External links

2000 births
Living people
Sportspeople from Melun
French footballers
France youth international footballers
Association football defenders
Stade Lavallois players
Olympique Lyonnais players
FC Red Bull Salzburg players
Championnat National players
Ligue 1 players
Austrian Football Bundesliga players
French expatriate footballers
Expatriate footballers in Austria
French expatriate sportspeople in Austria
French sportspeople of Central African Republic descent
Footballers from Seine-et-Marne
21st-century French people